Head On is a 1980 Canadian drama film directed by Michael Grant. It was entered into the 31st Berlin International Film Festival. It was released on VHS home video by Vestron Video in 1985 in the USA and has not yet been released on DVD. It is also known in the USA as Fatal Attraction (not to be confused with the 1987 film of the same name).

Plot
Michelle Keys and Peter Hill are two strangers in Toronto who meet by accident in a head-on traffic accident. Both of them receive only minor injuries but they bring legal action against each other. Soon their business relationship leads to romance as their mutual attraction to one another transforms into a bizarre game of sexual upmanship with each encounter becoming more perverse.

In their background stories, Michelle is a psychoanalyst who is married to an unattentive businessman, named Frank Keys, who is always traveling out of town on business trips. Peter is single and works an art professor at a local college while he keeps in close touch with his artist father, Clarke, which Peter attends art gallery showings of Clarke's paintings.

Michelle and Peter buy each other a car to replace their respective ones that were damaged by the accident, and soon set out play-acting various roles to stimulate their growing affair. Peter play-acts at Michelle's husband at one point as she play-acts confessing to him about her extramarital tryst. Soon, the sexual games become more dark when Peter tells Michelle to go to a local restaurant and wait for him. Peter shows up play-acting as a robber arriving to rob the place and takes Michelle away as his hostage which leads to him having rough sex with her in a tunnel.

Michelle and Peter's games come to a halt when Peter tells Michelle to dress up like a streetwalker and wait for him to pick her up for another sexual game. But the game goes terribly wrong when Peter is delayed at work, and Michelle is arrested by an undercover policeman who mistakes her for a prostitute. With Peter unreachable, Michelle is forced to call her husband, Frank, to bail her out and is forced to come clean all about her affair and games with Peter. Frank moves out, and Michelle ends her affair with Peter.

Some months later, Michelle and Peter meet again at Clarke's funeral where Peter wants to restart their sexual games now that Michelle is divorced. She instead forces Peter to prove his love to her by getting married. Peter agrees to marry Michelle, but backs out on her wedding day by not showing up out of his insecurity and fear of commitment.

The distraught Michelle shows up at Peter's house and resumes their games where both of them attempt to physically harm each other which becomes more dark and twisted. It leads to Michelle fleeing in her car and Peter chasing after her in his. In a final game, they both attempt to re-enact the car accident that led to them meeting in the first place and this time, both of them deliberately crash head-on into each other and the screen goes black – leaving it ambiguous if either of them will survive the impact.

Cast
 Sally Kellerman as Michelle Keys
 Stephen Lack as Peter Hill
 Lawrence Dane as Frank Keys
 J.P. Linton as Gad Bernstein (as John-Peter Linton)
 John Huston as Clarke Hill
 Patrick Crean as Fencing Master
 Marty Galin as Male Student
 Joann McIntyre as Female Student
 Sheila Currie as Young Nurse
 Sandra Scott as Head Nurse
 Hadley Kay as Michelle's Patient (Stanley)

References

External links

1980 films
1980 drama films
Canadian drama films
English-language Canadian films
1980s English-language films
1980s Canadian films